The following is an incomplete list of species of the mushroom genus Boletus. The genus has a widespread distribution and contains about 300 species. However, the genus is polyphyletic, and approximately only 10 percent of the described species are actually members of the Boletus sensu stricto clade (Singer's Boletus section Boletus, also known as the "Porcini Clade").

Species

Boletus abruptibulbus (Florida Panhandle, United States)
Boletus aereus - ontto beltza, porcino nero, queen bolete, bronzy bolete, bronzos vargánya
Boletus albisulphureus - chalky-white bolete
Boletus albobrunnescens – Thailand
Boletus alutaceus
Boletus amyloideus
Boletus atkinsonii
Boletus aurantiosplendens
Boletus aureissimus
Boletus aureomycelinus
Boletus aureus
Boletus auripes
Boletus austroedulis – Australia
Boletus bainiugan - China
Boletus bannaensis (Japan)
Boletus barragensis
Boletus barrowsii - white king bolete
Boletus bicoloroides
Boletus billieae
Boletus borneensis
Boletus botryoides - China
Boletus brasiliensis
Boletus bresidolanus
Boletus brevitubus
Boletus brunneirubens
Boletus brunneissimus
Boletus brunneopanoides
Boletus brunneotomentosus
Boletus caespitosus (edible)
Boletus calocystides
Boletus campestris (edible)
Boletus carminiporus
Boletus castaneo-brunneus
Boletus castanopsidis (Papua New Guinea)
Boletus citrinoporus
Boletus citrinovirens
Boletus coccyginus
Boletus coniferarum
Boletus cookei
Boletus curtisii
Boletus cutifractus
Boletus debeauxii
Boletus declivitatum
Boletus dimocarpicola
Boletus discolor
Boletus edulis - cep, porcini, king bolete, penny bun, ontto txuri
Boletus fagacicola
Boletus fairchildianus
Boletus ferrugineus
Boletus ferruginosporus
Boletus fibrillosus
Boletus flammans
Boletus flaviporus
Boletus flavoniger
Boletus flavus
Boletus formosus
Boletus fraternus (edible, but low quality)
Boletus fuligineus
Boletus fulvus
Boletus fuscopunctatus
Boletus gansuensis – China
Boletus gentiliis
Boletus gertrudiae
Boletus glabellus
Boletus granulopunctatus
Boletus griseus (edible)
Boletus gyrodontoides
Boletus haematinus
Boletus harrisonii
Boletus hemichrysus
Boletus holoxanthus
Boletus huronensis
Boletus hypoxanthus
Boletus instabilis
Boletus kermesinus (Japan)
Boletus laetissimus
Boletus leptospermi (New Zealand)
Boletus leuphaeus
Boletus lewisii
Boletus lignatilis
Boletus lignicola (edible)
Boletus longicurvipes (edible)
Boletus loyo
Boletus luridellus
Boletus lychnipes
Boletus mahogonicolor
Boletus manicus (New Guinea)
Boletus marekii (Czech Republic) 
Boletus megalosporus
Boletus melleoluteus
Boletus michoacanus
Boletus miniato-olivaceus
Boletus miniato-pallescens
Boletus modestus - China
Boletus monilifer
Boletus mottiae
Boletus neoregius
Boletus neotropicus
Boletus nigricans
Boletus nobilis
Boletus nobilissimus
Boletus novae-zelandiae
Boletus obscuratus
Boletus obscureumbrinus
Boletus occidentalis
Boletus ochraceoluteus
Boletus odaiensis
Boletus oliveisporus
Boletus orientialbus (China)
Boletus ornatipes (choice edible)
Boletus pallidoroseus
Boletus pallidus
Boletus paluster
Boletus paradisiacus
Boletus patrioticus
Boletus peltatus
Boletus perroseus
Boletus phaeocephalus
Boletus phytolaccae
Boletus pinetorum – Fennoscandia
Boletus pinophilus - pinewood penny bun, pine cep
Boletus poeticus
Boletus projectelloides
Boletus pruinatus
Boletus pseudoboletinus
Boletus pseudofrostii
Boletus pseudo-olivaceus
Boletus pseudoregius
Boletus puellaris
Boletus pulchriceps
Boletus punctilifer
Boletus purpureorubellus 
Boletus pyrrhosceles
Boletus quercinus
Boletus quercophilus
Boletus rawlingsii (New Zealand)
Boletus regineus - queen bolete
Boletus reticulatus - summer bolete
Boletus reticuloceps
Boletus rex-veris - spring king bolete
Boletus ripariellus
Boletus roseipes
Boletus roseoareolatus
Boletus roseolateritius – North America
Boletus roseolus
Boletus ruborculus
Boletus rubriceps – Rocky Mountain red (United States)
Boletus rubricitrinus
Boletus rubroflammeus
Boletus rubropunctus
Boletus rufo-aureus
Boletus rufo-brunnescens
Boletus rufocinnamomeus
Boletus rufomaculatus
Boletus rugosellus
Boletus rugosiceps
Boletus rugulosiceps
Boletus semigastroideus
Boletus sensibilis - brick-cap bolete (Eastern North America)
Boletus separans
Boletus sichianus
Boletus siculus
Boletus smithii (edible)
Boletus spadiceus (edible)
Boletus speciosus (edible)
Boletus sphaerocephalus
Boletus squamulistipes
Boletus subalpinus
Boletus subcaerulescens
Boletus subclavatosporus
Boletus subdepauperatus
Boletus subfraternus
Boletus subgraveolens
Boletus subluridellus
Boletus subluridus
Boletus subsanguineus
Boletus subsplendidus
Boletus subvelutipes
Boletus taianus
Boletus tasmanicus
Boletus tomentipes
Boletus tomentulosus
Boletus tristiculus
Boletus truncatus
Boletus tubulus
Boletus umbriniporus
Boletus variipes
Boletus velutipes
Boletus vermiculosoides
Boletus vermiculosus
Boletus vinaceobasis
Boletus violaceofuscus
Boletus viridiflavus
Boletus viscidiceps (China) 
Boletus viscidipellis (Japan)
Boletus viscidocorrugis
Boletus weberi
Boletus yunnanensis

See also
 Bolete eater

References

Sources

External links
 YouTube Video:Boletus species and more.. by Bill Yule, Connecticut Valley Mycological Society

Boletus